Football Federation of Ternopil Oblast is a football governing body in the region of Ternopil Oblast, Ukraine. The federation is a member of the Football Federation of Ukraine.

Previous Champions

1947    FC Lokomotyv Ternopil (1)
1948    FC Spartak Terebovlya (1)
1949    FC Lokomotyv Ternopil (2)
1950    FC Spartak Terebovlya (2)
1951    FC Shakhtar Kremenets (1)
1952    FC Lokomotyv Ternopil (3)
1953    ????
1954    ????
1955    Chortkiv (1)
1956    FC Dynamo Ternopil (1)
1957    FC Dynamo Ternopil (2)
1958    ATP Ternopil (1)
1959    Chortkiv (2)
1960    FC Motor Ternopil (1)
1961    FC Burevisnyk Kremenets (1)
1962    FC Burevisnyk Kremenets (2)
1963    FC Kolhospnyk Berezhany (1)
1964    FC Druzhba Chortkiv (1)
1965    FC Kolhospnyk Berezhany (2)
1966    FC Kolhospnyk Buchach (1)
1967    FC Kolhospnyk Buchach (2)
1968    FC Kolhospnyk Buchach (3)
1969    FC Kolos Buchach (4)
1970    FC Kolos Buchach (5)
1971    FC Kolos Buchach (6)
1972    FC Kolos Buchach (7)
1973    FC Kolos Buchach (8)
1974    FC Dnister Zalishchyky (1)
1975    FC Kombainobudivnyk Ternopil (1)
1976    FC Budivelnyk Monastyryska (1)
1977    FC Vatra Ternopil (1)
1978    FC Kombainobudivnyk Ternopil (2)
1979    FC Kombainobudivnyk Ternopil (3)
1980    FC Nyva Pidhaitsi (1)
1981    FC Vatra Ternopil (2)
1982    FC Zoria Khorostkiv (1)
1983    FC Vatra Ternopil (3)
1984    FC Avtomobilist Kopychyntsi (1)
1985    FC Dnister Zalishchyky (2)
1986    FC Nyva Berezhany (2)
1987    FC Nyva Berezhany (3)
1988    FC Nyva Berezhany (4)
1989    FC Tsukrovyk Chortkiv (1)
1990    FC Dnister Zalishchyky (3)
1991    FC Kolos Novosilka (1)
1992    FC Kolos Monastyryska (1)
1992-93 FC Kolos Monastyryska (2)
1993-94 FC Kolos Zboriv (1)
1994-95 FC Nyva Terebovlya (1)
1995-96 FC Zoria Khorostkiv (2)
1996-97 FC Zoria Khorostkiv (3)
1997-98 FC Zoria Khorostkiv (4)
1998-99 FC Sokil Velyki Hayi (1)
1999    FC Sokil Velyki Hayi (2)
2000    FC Lysonya Berezhany (5)
2001    FC Lysonya Berezhany (6)
2002    FC Avianosets Chortkiv (1)
2003    FC Avianosets Chortkiv (2)
2004    FC Dnister Zalishchyky (4)
2005    FC Brovar Mykulyntsi (1)
2006    FC Brovar Mykulyntsi (2)
2007    FC Ternopil-Burevisnyk (1)
2008    FC Halych Zbarazh (1)
2009    FC Ternopil (2)
2010    FC Ternopil (3)
2011    FC Ternopil-Peduniversytet (4)
2012    FC Berezhany (7)
2013    FC Chortkiv (2)
2014    FC Nyva Terebovlya (2)
2015    FC Nyva Terebovlya (3)
2016    FC Nyva Terebovlya (4)
2017    FC Ahron-OTH Velyki Hayi (1)
2018    FC Ahron-OTH Velyki Hayi (2)
2019    FC Ahron-OTH Velyki Hayi (3)

Top winners
 8 – FC Kolos (Kolhospnyk) Buchach 
 7 – FC Lysonya (Nyva) Berezhany 
 4 – 4 clubs (Dnister, Zoria, Nyva Trb, Ternopil)
 3 – 4 clubs (Lokomotyv, Kombainobudivnyk, Vatra, Ahron-OTH)
 2 – 10 clubs 
 1 – 9 clubs

Professional clubs
 FC Dynamo Chortkiv, 1946
 FC Stroitel Ternopil (Avagard), 1959-1968

See also
 FFU Council of Regions

References

External links
 Official website. Football Federation of Ternopil Oblast
 Ternopil football over the past years (Тернопільський футбол за останні роки). FFU Council of Regions. 13 February 2003. (list of champions 1991–2001)
 Malyshev, Yu. Nostalgia for the past (Ностальгія за минулим). FFU. 27 September 2010. (archived)
 Malyshev, Yu. From "Koło parku" – to a Euro-stadium (Від «Коло парку» – до євростадіону). FFU. 20 September 2010. (archived)
 Malyshev, Yu. Master of the "upper tier (étage)" (Господар «другого поверху»). FFU. 14 September 2010. (archived)
 Malyshev, Yu. Breakthrough to the elite (Прорив в еліту). FFU. 8 September 2010. (archived)
 Malyshev, Yu. Euro-hopes of Ternopil region (Євронадії Тернопільщини). FFU. 3 September 2010. (archived)

Football in the regions of Ukraine
Football governing bodies in Ukraine
Sport in Ternopil Oblast